Crosbylonia is a monotypic genus of Asian dwarf spiders containing the single species, Crosbylonia borealis. It was first described by K. Y. Eskov in 1988, and has only been found in and Russia.

See also
 List of Linyphiidae species

References

Linyphiidae
Monotypic Araneomorphae genera
Spiders of Russia